Denis Grenville Hinton (born 4 December 1939) is a former Australian politician.

He was born in Perth to Howard Hinton and Muriel Rose, née Abbot. He was educated at Northcote High School in Melbourne and then Dookie Agricultural College, where he received a Diploma of Agriculture. He became a pig farmer in Queensland and joined the National Party, serving as a Banana Shire Councillor from 1967 to 1970. In 1986 he was elected to the Queensland Legislative Assembly as the member for Broadsound, but he was defeated in 1989.

References

1939 births
Living people
National Party of Australia members of the Parliament of Queensland
Members of the Queensland Legislative Assembly